Pietro Nascimbene (born 22 February 1930) is an Italian racing cyclist. He won stage 12 of the 1956 Giro d'Italia.

References

External links
 

1930 births
Living people
Italian male cyclists
Italian Giro d'Italia stage winners
Place of birth missing (living people)
Cyclists from the Province of Pavia